Knut Kjeldstadli (born 6 June 1948, in Oslo) is a Norwegian historian. Kjeldstadli completed his examen artium at Oslo Cathedral School in 1967 before studying English and social economics at the University of Oslo, where he completed his master in history in 1977. He took his doctorate in 1989 with the paper Jerntid. Fabrikksystem og arbeidere ved Christiania Spigerverk og Kværner Brug fra om lag 1890 til 1940. He became adjunct professor at the University of Bergen in 1992, and then professor at the University of Oslo in 1996. He is a member of the Norwegian Academy of Science and Letters. Kjeldstadli is also involved in politics, in the Socialist Left Party as well as ATTAC. Kjeldstadli was awarded the Brage Prize in 2003 for serving as editor of Norsk innvandringshistorie. He was also a recipient of the Sverre Steen Award in 2004. He was the son of historian Sverre Kjeldstadli, paternal grandson of trade unionist Lars Kjeldstadli, maternal grandson of editor Daniel Grini and grandnephew of politician Sigvart Grini.

Selected bibliography
Det Norske Arbeiderpartiet: fra folkebevegelse til statsstøtte, 1973
"Arbeider, bonde, våre hære..." – Arbeiderpartiet og bøndene 1930–1939, 1978
Jerntid. Fabrikksystem og arbeidere ved Christiania Spigerverk og Kværner Brug fra om lag 1890 til 1940, 1989
Den delte byen: 1900–1948, 1990 (volume 4 in Oslo bys historie)
Fortida er ikke hva den engang var. En innføring i historiefaget, 1992
Et splittet folk 1905–35, 1994 (volume 10 in Aschehougs Norgeshistorie)
Oslo – spenningenes by- oslohistorie, 1995, with Jan Eivind MyhreNorsk innvandringshistorie (ed.), 2004Akademisk kapitalisme'', 2010

References

University of Oslo

1948 births
Living people
Writers from Oslo
20th-century Norwegian historians
Academic staff of the University of Bergen
Academic staff of the University of Oslo
Members of the Norwegian Academy of Science and Letters
University of Oslo alumni
People educated at Oslo Cathedral School
21st-century Norwegian historians